Ron Capps is an American NHRA Funny Car racer who owns and drives the NAPA Auto Parts Toyota Supra.

Capps drove for Don Prudhomme, who recruited him from Top Fuel dragsters, and later for Don Schumacher, winning twenty NHRA Funny Car national events and three Skoal Showdowns, coming second in the NHRA title race three times, twice behind John Force, once (while with Schumacher) trailing teammate Gary Scelzi.  

Since he began driving funny cars, Capps has earned 67 NHRA national event wins and has come second in the championship three times. 

His best career elapsed time is 3.837 seconds. His best career speed is 339.28 mph. Capps won his first NHRA Mello Yello Series Funny Car championship in 2016.

References

Sources
Burk, Jeff.  “50 Years of Funny Cars:  Part 3” in Drag Racer, November 2016, pp.52-64.

External links
 

People from San Luis Obispo, California
1965 births
Racing drivers from California
Living people